Skanderborg Aarhus Håndbold, previously Skanderborg Håndbold, is a men's handball club based in Skanderborg in Jutland, Denmark. The club was founded in 1982 and was the result of a merger between Stilling-Skanderborg and Vrold-Skanderborg Handball Club. In 2021 Aarhus Håndbold merged with Skanderborg Håndbold's men's team, and they changed the name to Skanderborg Aarhus Håndbold. 

The women's team still goes by the name Skanderborg Håndbold.

Team

Staff
Staff for the 2019-20 season

Current squad
Squad for the 2022–23 season

Goalkeeper
 1  Kristoffer Laursen
 12  Salah Boutaf
Wingers
LW
 4  Lars Skaarup
 24  Anton Bramming
RW
 3  Hákun West Av Teigum
 25  Magnus Vejsgaard
Pivots
 3  Lars Mousing
 5  Frederik Sommer Arnoldsen
 19  Thor Christensen

Back players
LB
 6  Kristian Bonefeld
 8  Torben Petersen
 13  Lukas Goller
 23  Morten Hempel Jensen
CB
 11  Thomas Sommer Arnoldsen
 20  Morten Balling
 27  Nicolai Skytte
RB
 7  Jonathan Mollerup

Transfers
Transfers for the 2023–24 season

Joining
  Fredrik Olsson (LB) (from  Lugi HF) 
  Mikkel Lang Rasmussen (RW) (from  Skjern Håndbold) 

Leaving
  Thomas Sommer Arnoldsen (CB) (to  Aalborg Håndbold)
  Nicolai Skytte (CB) (to  Grindsted GIF)
  Hákun West Av Teigum (RW) (to  Füchse Berlin)

References

Danish handball clubs
Skanderborg Municipality
Handball clubs established in 1982
1982 establishments in Denmark